Caetano Infancio De Souza Pinho (born 18 September 1976) is a Indian professional football manager. He is current manager of I-League club Aizawl.

Early life
Pinho was born in Goa, India. All his family members were lawyers by profession. He then went to Don Bosco High School and Dempo College of Commerce and Economics. He then became an employer for Oil and Natural Gas Corporation.

Coaching career

ONGC
In 1996, Pinho joined as the player of ONGC F.C. and went on to become the coach of ONGC in 2011 of the NFL 2nd Division. Before that he played for Salgaocar S.C., Vasco S.C. and even the ONGC after graduating from SAI Sports Hostel, Goa.

In 2010, Pinho became the asstt coach of the team going into the 2010–11 season of the I-League, their first ever. Unfortunately after one season with ONGC in the I-League, the club were relegated back into the I-League 2nd Division and Pinho's job was on the line as ONGC were considering folding the club and even Pinho himself said "The club’s poor showing had not gone down well with the management, who it was believed were even considering the most extreme of repercussions. For a company which supports 16 different disciplines of sports around the country, they had after all pumped in the maximum amount of money into the football club's coffers."

Luckily ONGC allowed the club to continue and next season, Pinho and ONGC were participating in the 2012 I-League 2nd Division where they ended as champions in the Final Round.

Personal
Pinho is a spiritual person and likes to read books like the Holy Bible. He also likes to help less fortunate people.

His favorite player is Lionel Messi, favorite coach is Armando Colaco & Pep Guardiola and favorite club is FC Barcelona.

Managerial statistics

References

Indian footballers
Footballers from Goa
Living people
I-League managers
ONGC FC players
Association football midfielders
Indian football managers
1976 births
Aizawl FC managers